Jeremiah Regan (born 1832) was a Quartermaster of the United States Navy who was awarded the Medal of Honor for gallantry during the American Civil War. Despite the danger of the situation, Regan continued to man his gun throughout the engagement. For these actions, he was awarded the Medal of Honor on 3 April 1863 by President Lincoln.

Personal life 
Regan was born in 1832 in Boston, Massachusetts.

Military service 
During the attack on Drewry's Bluff and the fort, Regan continued to man his gun despite the fire directed at the ship from Confederate sharpshooters and an artillery shell which injured or killed most of his crewmates. He made a dangerous climb up the forerigging under heavy fire and cleared the halyards, throwing away the ship's white flag. He then returned to man his gun. Regan was one of three crew members to receive a Medal of Honor for action on that day, the others being First Class Fireman Charles Kenyon and Marine Corporal John Mackie.

Regan's Medal of Honor citation reads:

A marker now stands in Richmond National Battlefield Park at  37° 25.329′ N, 77° 25.301′ W commemorating the three Medal of Honor awardees.

References 

Quartermasters
Union Navy personnel
1832 births
Year of death missing